Chamu Krishna Shastry (born 23 January 1956) is an Indian Educationist who has been working for the revival of the Sanskrit language. He is the trustee and Secretary of Samskrit Promotion Foundation. He is also the co-founder of Samskrita Bharati. Now he is spearheading a movement to teach Sanskrit Through Sanskrit On 25 January 2017, Government of India announced "Padma Shri" award in the category Literature and education for his contribution towards the promotion of Sanskrit.

Early life 
Shastry was born on 23 January 1956 in Kedila village near Mangalore (Bantwal taluk). He learnt Sanskrit from the Rashtriya Sanskrit Vidyapeetha at Tirupati. As a teenaged Rashtriya Swayamsevak Sangh worker Shastry was imprisoned during the Emergency. Alone in his cell, he took to reading biographies. In the writings of Vinayak Damodar Savarkar and Swami Vivekananda he learnt how Sanskrit could unlock scientific, mathematical and medical knowledge buried in ancient Sanskrit texts.

Career

Speak Samskrit movement 
Krishna Shastry, along with some of his friends, went on to start the ‘Speak Samskrit’ Movement in 1981 from Bangalore. His method of teaching Sanskrit is to let the student learn it in the same language rather than through another language by translation. Learning Sanskrit can be a forbidding exercise because it is being taught through translation. To make it easier for the students, Shastry's method is not to learn the language through grammar, but to teach Sanskrit as it is spoken. Students thus do not have to wrestle with the nuances of an arcane syntactics. It's then easier to master the language, so much so that even semi-literate people can opt for the course.

Samskrita Bharati 

The movement eventually evolved into the not-for-profit organisation Samskrita Bharati, a voluntary body committed to the cause of Sanskrit. Shastry's efforts led to the development of the very popular "Ten-day Sanskrit Speaking Course" of Samskrita Bharati. He has inspired a dedicated work force for Sanskrit across the country which is leading the propagation work at various states. Samskrita Bharati and Shastry have been implementing the 10 day course through a network of 250 full-time workers and 5,000 Sanskrit Bharati volunteers. It also helps that the course is offered for free. Samskrita Bharati has enabled nearly one crore people to learn and converse in Sanskrit the language, one lakh of whom have decided to use Sanskrit at home in true ancient style.

Shastry's efforts have also led many universities and colleges to adopt the communicative teaching method for Sanskrit. In the US, SAFL (Samskrit as a Foreign Language) is a popular course among the children of Indian origin. Samskrita Bharati is active all over India and in 13 countries including USA, Canada, UK and the UAE. The organisation is also credited with the revival of Sanskrit in Gujarat

A few unique experiments like "Samskrit Homes" and "Samskrit mother tongue Children" are popular. "Saraswati Seva" is a project through which hundreds of books from other Indian and foreign Languages are translated into Sanskrit. To promote young authors and modern books in Sanskrit he has organised events such as "Samskrit Book Fair", and "Sahityotsava".

Vision 
Shastry sees Sanskrit as being India's lingua franca. He says, "Till now Samskrit has only been seen from a spiritual or religious perspective; it is high time Samskrit is approached from a scientific point of view as well." He opines that Sanskrit would be a unifying factor in India.

Shastry believes in taking Sanskrit to the under-privileged. He echoes Dr. Ambedkar's support for Sanskrit as a platform for enabling social upliftment and equality.

Samskrit Promotion Foundation

Krishna shastry has helped to start the Samskrit Promotion Foundation, which is an institution in developing Sanskrit Tutorials for students and in producing various new course materials for "Sanskrit for Special Purposes" a not for profit trust, that aims to "popularise Samskrit" in India again and among other objectives leverage Samskrit as an "effective tool" to socially and economically "empower the weaker sections" of the society. The trustees include eminent citizens like former Chief Justice of India R. C. Lahoti, for Chief Election Commissioner N. Gopalaswami, Justice Rama Jois, S. Gurumurthy, among others. Shastry is a key trustee and secretary of this trust.

Influencing policy 

Shastry spends most of his time on teacher training, workshops, making of learning material and discussing Sanskrit education with policy makers. He believes that not just Sanskrit as language, but modern subjects like chemistry, maths, history etc. should also be taught through Sanskrit.

He was also a member of the Central Government constituted Sanskrit Committee that developed the "Road Map for the Development of Sanskrit – Ten Year Perspective Plan" document in 2016.

Others

His extensive experience in education and teaching methods has led to his being on the Board of Rashtriya Sanskrit Sansthan and many other universities.

Shastry is a much renowned speaker and he is highly regarded for his fluent and fiery oratory in Sanskrit. He believes in the dictum of the Bhagavad Gita to work towards a goal without expectations and has taken a personal vow of not accepting honors and awards. He is a prolific writer and has written a dozen books and numerous articles in Sanskrit.

Books

He has authored 13 books in the Sanskrit language.

 Savdhana Syaam 
 Utthistatha Ma Svapthaha (Get up! Don't Sleep!!) 
 Parishkaaraha (Essays in Sanskrit)

Awards 

 Saraswata Sudhakara in 1984 from Kashi Pandit Parishat
 Rashtriya Yuva Puraskar in 1985 from ABVP
 Padma Shri Award in 2017

References

1956 births
Living people
People from Dakshina Kannada district
20th-century Indian linguists
Rashtriya Swayamsevak Sangh members
Recipients of the Padma Shri in literature & education
Sanskrit revival
Language activists